Potrero Hills Pond is a small lake in Richmond, California. It was formed from quarrying of hills near Potrero Hills at the Blake Brothers Quarry. It is fed by underground springs. It is now polluted and surrounded by a Chevron Richmond Refinery tank farm.

See also
List of lakes in California
List of lakes in the San Francisco Bay Area

References

Lakes of the San Francisco Bay Area
Bodies of water of Richmond, California
Lakes of California
Lakes of Contra Costa County, California
Lakes of Northern California